That Wilkin Boy is a comic book series published by Archie Comics about a teenage boy, Bingo Wilkin, who lives in Midville, next door to his girlfriend, Samantha Smythe.  That Wilkin Boy debuted with issue 1 dated January 1969 (so it was on sale in late 1968), and ran until issue 52 dated October 1982. The book, which spotlights Bingo's garage band the Bingoes, was released as Archie's more well-known title character had found real-world recording success with the release of The Archies' "Sugar, Sugar".

Characters

Principal characters
Woodrow "Bingo" Wilkin III The brown-haired rambunctious 17-year-old main protagonist who's a popular student at Midville High School.  He's steady with his girlfriend Samantha (see below), which is a source of trouble for her father.  Bingo also leads his pop rock group The Bingoes—he's the lead vocalist and plays lead guitar.  He also plays sports for Midville High School. Bingo was eventually revealed to be the cousin of "Jughead" Jones. This is ironic, as he is really more like Archie: clumsy, accident prone, and highly interested in dating. However, he remains faithful to only one girl, Samantha. The fact that their fathers never get along, and that Samantha’s father is prejudiced against him for being weak and clumsy, is an obstacle in their relationship.
Samantha Smythe A vivacious squash-blonde-haired 17-year-old, Samantha is Bingo's steady girlfriend, much to the chagrin of her tough, militant-minded father. She also fills-in with a tambourine and backing vocals with The Bingoes. Her family lives next door the Wilkins. Due to the influence of her father, she has built up her strength to the point where she is stronger than Bingo (a fact often humorously referenced in the comics). She resembles Betty Cooper in a number of ways. She discourages female stereotypes, as she has appeared in stories involving feminism, and had a steady boyfriend despite appearing somewhat tomboyish.
Uncle Herman The uncle to both Bingo and Jughead Jones. He played professional baseball when he was younger, and can be seen talking about it and playing it in the back yard. His baseball nickname was "Rabbit". He also enjoys inventing and tinkering with machines. His last name had been given as Wilkin in the 1970s, making him the brother to Bingo's father.  When That Wilkin Boy was reintroduced in 2006, it was made clear that Herman was now the brother of Bingo's mother, a minor retcon that presumably changes his last name.
Sampson Smythe Samantha's militant-minded, muscular father who hates the sights (and sounds) of his daughter going out steady with Bingo. He often picks fights with the neighbors, and (tries to) foil Bingo and his pals. In one story, he was nicknamed "Hurricane". He likes lifting weights, and dislikes Bingo, whom he thinks is unmanly. One of his targets is Bingo's father, Willie, whom he calls "Wee Willie", or "Weak Willie," among other things, but mostly refers to him as "Wilkins", deliberately saying his surname incorrectly, as this infuriates Willie to no end. When he is actually angry at Willie, however, he uses it correctly. To add insult to injury, though, his wife and Willie's wife are best friends and are often called upon to referee their husbands when they are bickering. Nonetheless, Samson, usually not without having had to eat crow, sees that Bingo makes Samantha happy, and he really does want her to have happiness.
Tough Teddy Tambourine A slim, muscular, and macho 18-year-old young man who knows how to play "cool". He sports closely cropped black hair, thick eyebrows, sunglasses, and often flashy fashions. Teddy performs backing vocals and bass guitar (sometimes banjo or percussion) for The Bingoes. Something of a playboy, he often tries to win over Samantha, and sometimes has her father’s support in it, but he never succeeds. A character very much like Reggie Mantle, he is often a victim of Rebel’s schemes, especially when Teddy tries to discredit Bingo in some way.
Buddy Drumhead A soft-spoken 17-year-old hippie chum of Bingo and Teddy's, who plays the drums in The Bingoes, and hits his drumsticks on everything around him.  He wears a funny hat (usually a black one with a wide brim) and likes to ride his motorbike. More or less content with his lot in life, he prefers not to get involved with his friends’ relationship problems.
Rebel A golden orange spotted beagle with the power of conscious thought. He often comes to Bingo's aid in a pinch, and has a mutual hate relationship with Teddy. Rebel is often the one who makes sure that Teddy does not interfere with Bingo and Samantha’s relationship. Teddy is the only one who knows that Rebel is sentient, and Rebel mocks him by performing (for a dog) unusual acts solely in his presence.

Supporting characters
William "Willie" Wilkin Bingo's father, a short, stout, bespectacled businessman. His full first name in one story is given as William rather than Woodrow, so it is not known whom Bingo is named after. He is very choleric, throwing a fit every time he gets upset, and is especially sensitive about Sampson Smythe constantly and deliberately mispronouncing his name as "Wilkins", even when out of immediate hearing range. The only thing the two can mutually agree on is their intense dislike for The Bingoes, especially when they are invited to their homes for practice.
Wilma Wilkin Bingo’s mother, and the sister of Uncle Herman and Gladys Jones.  She and Sheila Smythe are best friends. Their husbands are constantly fighting, leaving it up to them to break it up.
Sheila Smythe Mr. Smythe’s down-to-earth homemaker wife. She is more understanding than her husband. She and Bingo’s mother are pleased that Bingo and Samantha date. Sheila Smythe is often seen trying to make her husband see things the other way.

Occasional characters

Jughead Jones A main character from the Archie comic series who is Bingo’s cousin. He appears when the stories cross over.
Mr. Sanders An African-American teacher at Midville High School who is very warm-hearted and supportive toward Bingo.
Zelda Maxson A girl who moved to Midville with her widowed mother. Samantha saw her as competition for Bingo (though Zelda once developed a crush on Buddy).
Mr. Parker The phys-ed teacher and sports director at Midville High School.

Comparison to Archie

The series has much in common with other Archie titles- a somewhat clumsy "everyman" character (Bingo) dates, hangs out with his friends, and causes general mayhem among antagonists, which includes his girlfriend's father (reflecting Archie's own relationship with Mr. Lodge). However, the series differs from most other Archie series in one significant way: the title character has only a single love interest, and is not at the centre of a love triangle. The series lacks an equivalent of Veronica Lodge.

Additionally, Bingo’s band the Bingoes is much like the Archies (minus Veronica) but with a style that reflects the 1960s/1970s counterculture. Bingo’s girlfriend Samantha shares some characteristics with Betty Cooper: a sweet, level headed, athletic girl-next-door who loves only Bingo. Tough Teddy is heavily inspired by Reggie Mantle, and Buddy bears at least a passing resemblance to Jughead Jones.

As the series progressed, the stories became slightly more moral with a slightly dramatic tone. It often dealt with more serious issues, such as feminism, prejudice, runaways or crime, reflecting Archie Comics’ tendencies of the 1970s.

Common story elements

 Mr. Smythe and Mr. Wilkin argue, making Bingo and Samantha’s relationship difficult.
 Mr. Smythe has an inflexible negative opinion of someone or something, but changes his mind by the end.
 The Bingoes have a gig or practice, but mishaps occur for them.
 Teddy tries to take Samantha away from Bingo, but never succeeds (and Bingo never discovers how duplicitous Teddy is).
 Uncle Herman reflects on his days as a baseball player, sometimes re-enacting the game.
 Bingo’s clumsiness causes him to break or damage things, getting him in trouble.
 Mr. Smythe tries to keep Bingo from dating his daughter.
 Bingo embarrasses or injures himself trying to compete athletically with Samantha.
 In stories involving Rebel, Bingo's dog, he usually manages to perform some feat that brings honor to the Wilkin family name and embarrass Teddy, in the process.
 Example, for disrupting a beach jam session held by Teddy and some friends, Rebel gets sent out to sea on a small scrap of wood, but manages to use the wood to surf and then feeds Teddy a mouthful of board.
 In another story, after Rebel takes a verbal beating at the hands of Teddy, he ends up using his nose to find Teddy's purebred dog in the dump with other mutts.

The reintroduction of Bingo Wilkin in Archie Comics

Previously published stories from That Wilkin Boy are frequently featured in digest magazines, most notably as a regular feature in Jughead & Friends Digest. To promote the reprints, Archie Comics featured an official "reintroduction" of That Wilkin Boy in Jughead & Friends Digest #5.

The linkup of Bingo and Uncle Herman to Jughead is illustrated in the lead story "Cry Uncle" in issue 5 (2006) of Jughead & Friends Digest.  In it, Jughead visits his Uncle Herman in Midville; as it turns out, Uncle Herman is related to both Bingo and Jughead. Both of their mothers are his younger sisters. Teddy and Buddy briefly appear and make remarks about Jughead's famous gray crown beanie.  Bingo and Samantha tried to bake a cake for their school's cooking class, and hilarity ensues as usual.

The idea to make the two characters related was the brainchild of Archie Digest Editor Nelson Ribeiro. This would help link the characters since they would be appearing in the same book, Jughead & Friends Digest. Through researching the archives Nelson found that Jughead also had an 'Uncle Herman' who was a tinkerer, so it only seemed natural to combine Bingo's Uncle Herman with Jughead's to provide the family link between the two characters.

References

Characters created by Dan DeCarlo
Archie Comics titles
Archie Comics characters
Fictional rock musicians
1969 comics debuts
Humor comics